The 2017–18 Finnish Cup (Suomen Cup) was the 63rd season of the Finnish Cup. It was the second edition of the tournament to be played on a fall-spring schedule, running from July to September of the following year. The introduction of this new competition format meant that the Liiga Cup was discontinued.

The winner of the Men's Finnish Cup was awarded a cash prize of EUR 50,000 with the runners up receiving EUR 10,000. The winner also qualified for the 2019–20 UEFA Europa League. Times up to 28 October 2017 and from 25 March 2018 are EEST (UTC+3). Times from 29 October 2017 to 24 March 2018 are EET (UTC+2).

Teams

First round 
The first and second rounds of the Cup will include all registered teams, with the exception of Veikkausliiga and Ykkönen teams, who will be included in the 30-team group stage early in 2017.  The first rounds will include teams playing in the Kakkonen and below.

Second round

Third round

Fourth Round

Group stage 
The teams participating in the Group Stage will be the 2017 Veikkausliiga teams (12), 2017 Ykkönen teams (10) and eight teams from the early rounds of the competition.  The Group Stage will be played between January and March 2018 with the teams divided into five regional groups, with six teams per group.  The top two teams from the group stage will advance directly to the semi-finals, while the remaining winners of each group and each second-place finisher will proceed to the quarterfinals.

Group A

Group B

Group C

Group D

Group E

Knock-out stage

Play-offs for Quarter-finals

Quarter-finals

Semi-finals

Final

References

Cup 2016-17
Cup 2016-17
Finnish Cup seasons
Finland